Miguel Ângelo Gomes Ferreira Magalhães (born 16 November 2002), known as just Miguel Maga, is a Portuguese professional footballer who plays as a right-back for the Liga Portugal 2 club Oliveirense.

Club career
Maga is a youth product of the academies of Porto, Rio Ave, Padroense and Vitória Guimarães. He began his senior career with Vitória Guimarães B in 2021. On 21 April 2022, he signed a professional contract keeping him with Vitória Guimarães until 2025.

International career
Maga is a youth international for Portugal, having been called up to the Portugal U20s in March 2022.

References

External links
 
 

2002 births
Living people
Sportspeople from Porto
Portuguese footballers
Portugal youth international footballers
Association football fullbacks
Vitória S.C. players
Vitória S.C. B players
U.D. Oliveirense players
Campeonato de Portugal (league) players
Liga Portugal 2 players